Crosby Battery, also known as Crosby Point Battery and Fort Crosby, was an artillery battery situated between Crosby and Hightown in Lancashire, United Kingdom. The battery was used for port defence and anti-aircraft defence during WWII. Until 1928 Crosby Battery worked in conjunction with the nearby Seaforth Battery.

History

Crosby Battery was built on the sand dunes north of Crosby between March 1906 and October 1907. The original complement of guns were two  breech-loading Mark VII guns, which were the same as those installed at nearby Fort Perch Rock, on the opposite side of the mouth of the River Mersey. Behind the positions were two barracks and soldiers' quarters. Around the battery was an observation post, a signal station, an officers' hut, caretaker's accommodation, a bath house, a workshop. An engine room, with coastal spotlights, was built later. The battery was given the designation S0011771.

The battery was the headquarters for the Lancashire and Cheshire Heavy Brigade, Royal Artillery (TF). On the outbreak of the First World War Fort Crosby, Seaforth Battery and Fort Perch Rock were responsible for the defence of the River Mersey.
By the Second World War the defences of the Mersey comprised two 6-inch guns at Crosby Battery and two 6-inch guns at Fort Perch Rock. Fort Crosby received a naval 4-inch Breech loading (BL) gun, which was mounted on the right flank of the battery.
 
After the Second World War, the Territorial Army used the area, until 1954. The base was subsequently closed in 1957 on the dissolution of coast artillery in the United Kingdom announced in 1956.

After permission was given for a housing development at Hightown, the Ministry of Defence sold the battery, in 1963, including  of foreshore. Many of the buildings were demolished, following this, in 1967. However, the site of the battery still exists, adjacent to the West Lancashire Golf Course. As of 2020, the site still consists of the stone gun emplacements, but the area where the barracks and operational buildings has now been cleared. This area is noticeable from the surrounding areas however, as a flat clearing amongst the dunes. As of 2020, no plaques, plinths or signage exist to commemorate the Fort.

References

Bibliography

Crosby, Merseyside
Forts in Merseyside
Artillery batteries